Citizens for an Alternative Tax System (CATS) is a national tax reform public interest group in the United States. Their Las Vegas chapter proposes "that Congress should eliminate the IRS and all income taxes, corporate and personal; estate, gift and inheritance taxes, plus many excise taxes; replacing them with a single-rate tax on consumption—a national retail sales tax.

According to sources, CATS was founded by Steven L. Hayes and shares a similar mission to national retail sales tax (NRST) and FairTax proponents such as John McCain, Fred Thompson, Mike Huckabee, Tom Tancredo, Duncan L. Hunter, Mike Gravel, John Lindner and Saxby Chambliss. Early in its existence it enjoyed the support of the Church of Scientology, apparently as the organization's end goal involved the dissolution of the IRS at a time when Scientology was struggling to regain its tax-exempt status.

CATS was incorporated in October 1990 and expanded from nine local offices to over 300 chapters across the country. In the first years, the CATS national office conducted over 3,500 radio shows and distributed thousands of flyers through its growing grassroots network.

See also

 Americans For Fair Taxation
 Consumption tax
 FairTax
 Single tax
 Tax shift

References

External links
 Citizens for an Alternative Tax System

Tax reform in the United States
Taxpayer groups
Scientology-related controversies